Ocotal is the capital of the Nueva Segovia Department in Nicaragua, Central America and the municipal seat of Ocotal Municipality.

History
The region currently occupied by the city of Ocotal was occupied by different ethnic groups that had probably migrated from Mexico to Central America many centuries ago, speaking a variety of Nahuatl.

The gold deposits that were found on the banks of the Choluteca River and other places, motivated the establishment of Spanish settlements. The city was founded in 1543 under the name of Nueva Segovia but this was later changed to Ocotal, a Nahuatl word that means "pine resin".

In 1927, Ocotal suffered one of the first dive bombing attacks in history during a battle that pitted the American Marines and the Nicaraguan National Guard against Sandinista rebels.
Ocotal is the same city that was founded by Spanish colonialists in 1543, with the name Nueva Segovia.

During the 2009 Honduran constitutional crisis, ousted Honduran president Manuel Zelaya set up a government-in-exile in the city briefly in July during reconciliation negotiations with coup leaders.

Description
Ocotal is the capital of the Nueva Segovia Department in Nicaragua. The main production is coffee, and lumbering.  The city, with a population of 39,450 (as of 2000), is located in a valley. The name comes from the nahuatl root "ocotl" for pine resin, and the Spanish suffix "al", due to the abundance of ocote pines. Ocotal was the third Spanish colony (after León and Granada) founded in what would eventually be called the Province of Nicaragua and Costa Rica. Its original name was Nueva Ciudad Segovia (New Segovia) and its foundation is credited to Rodrigo de Contreras in 1543.

Attractions include the Dipilto-Jalapa pine forests to the north, the Segovia River ( long) to the south, the indigenous and artisan town of Mozonte, as well as multiple hiking opportunities around its picturesque mountains. The old town center boasts some of the oldest colonial buildings in the region, such la Asuncion Parrish Church, as well as Plaza Central, a very well preserved garden in the middle of the commercial center featuring hundreds of species of flowers and tropical plants. Due to its valley location and close proximity to Nicaragua's highest mountains, enjoys cool weather, avoiding the extreme heat of the Pacific Zone in western Nicaragua. Some "yet-to-discover" activities also include hiking the majestic Mount Guásara, letting the Segovia or Coco River drag you down from "El Saltarin" all the way to Ocotal Bridge, or simply visiting one of the many surrounding coffee farms while enjoying the landscape. A day trip to El Rosario Waterfalls east from Ocotal is also worth visiting.

Geography
Characterised by steep hills in the north and south, plateaus in the west and a valley in the center.

Administration

There are 29 neighbourhoods: José Santos Rodríguez, Sandino, Hermanos Zamora, Teodoro López, Monseñor Madrigal, José Santos Duarte, Danilo Ponce, Yelba María Antúnez, Anexo Yelba María Antunez, Noel Weelock, Enrique Lacayo Farfán, Anexo Laura Sofía, Roberto Gómez Montalvan, Laura Sofía Olivas Paz, Nicarao, Leonardo Matute, 26 de septiembre, Santa Ana, Carlos Manuel Jarquin, Ramón Augusto López, Nora Astorga, Cristo del Rosario, Nuevo Amanecer, María Auxiliadora, Dinamarca, Pueblos unidos (where the Colonia del Maestro y 8 de mayo zones have been built).

10 Municipal zones containing 22 Administrative areas

Sport
Ocotal has a well known soccer team known as Deportivo Ocotal

International relations

Twin towns – Sister cities
Ocotal is twinned with:

Gallery

Map
A map of Ocotal is being created by the OpenStreetMap project here

External links

  Radio Segovia
 Videos in Spanish and some English of Ocotal with links to the surrounding areas
  Brief outline of Ocotal 1999
 Battle of Ocotal
 Battle of Ocotal from Nicanews
 Groundwater study. Includes geography and history (.pdf)
 Home page of Deportivo Ocotal (in Spanish)
 Detailed information on the Sandino Rebellion, includes reports from the battle at Ocotal
 Nicaraguan Expat site
 More information on the central park (Spanish)
  La Gruta de la Virgen de Guadalupe - Ocotal, Nicaragua 
 Urban planning -  Hurricane Mitch
 Hurricane Mitch
 Report on Landmines Nicaragua page 123

References

Municipalities of the Nueva Segovia Department
1543 establishments in the Spanish Empire
Populated places established in 1543